Grevillea juncifolia, commonly known as honeysuckle grevillea, honey grevillea, honeysuckle spider flower, and many indigenous names, is a species of flowering plant in the family Proteaceae and is endemic to inland Australia. It is a bushy shrub or small tree with erect, linear leaves and clusters of bright yellow to orange flowers.

Description
The edges of the leaves or lobes are rolled under with two parallel woolly-hairy grooves on the lower side.

Taxonomy and naming
Grevillea juncifolia was first formally described in 1848 by English botanist William Jackson Hooker in Thomas Mitchell's  Journal of an Expedition into the Interior of Tropical Australia. The specific epithet (juncifolia) means "rush-leaved".

In 2008, Peter M. Olde and Neil R. Marriott described two subspecies of G. juncifolia in The Grevillea Book, and the names are accepted by the Australian Plant Census:
 Grevillea juncifolia  Olde & Marriott subsp. juncifolia has leaves that are mostly or all divided with divided leaves;
 Grevillea juncifolia subsp. temulenta Olde & Marriott has undivided, linear leaves.

Indigenous Australians in the Northern Territory give this grevillea many names including tharrkarr (Alyawarre), rrwerleng (Anmatyerre), irrwerlenge (Eastern Arrernte), tharrkarre (Kaytetye), ultukunpa (Pintupi Luritja), ultukunpa (Pitjantjatjara), jiriwuru (Warumungu) and walunarri (Warlpiri).

Distribution and habitat
Honeysuckle grevillea grows in open shrubland or woodland on sandplains, stony hills and open plains, and occurs in inland Australia, in all mainland states and in the Northern Territory, but not in Victoria or Tasmania. Subspecies temulenta is restricted to Western Australia.

Uses
Indigenous Australians use this grevillea for food and medicine.

References

juncifolia
Proteales of Australia
Flora of New South Wales
Flora of the Northern Territory
Flora of Queensland
Flora of South Australia
Eudicots of Western Australia
Taxa named by William Jackson Hooker
Plants described in 1848